Žabljak Crnojevića, commonly referred to as Žabljak, is an abandoned medieval fortified town (fortress) in Montenegro. The fortress is located on the confluence of the Morača river in Lake Skadar.

History
It is believed that this fortress was founded in the 10th century during the reign of the Vojislavljević dynasty in then-known Dioclea, whereas the first known written testimony of the fortress originate from mid-14th century. The fortress served as the capital of Zeta under the Crnojević dynasty from 1466 till 1478, being the seat of Stefan and Ivan Crnojević. However, Ivan Crnojević was forced to move the capital in 1478 when the Ottomans seized the town during the siege of Shkodra, holding it until the decision of the Berlin Congress in 1878 when it fell under Montenegrin administration once again after 400 years of Turkish rule. The town has tall walls with towers, as well as one gate. Within the walls can be found: Ivan Crnojević's court, Church of Saint George (was turned into a mosque during Ottoman rule), housing and military facilities, a warehouse for clothes and a water tank, most of which are preserved.

In the early 17th century, the town was under Ottoman rule. The fortress had only one resident, the Dizdar Aga (Turkish official).

In the past Žabljak was home to a significant Albanian community. They were largely expelled in different waves during the late 19th century expulsion of the Albanians fleeing to Turkey, Kosovo (Pristina) and Macedonia.

Demographics

Gallery

References 

 Istorijski leksikon Crne Gore, 5. dio: Žabljak Crnojevića 
 Montenegro.com: Zabljak Crnojevica
 Visit-Montenegro: Rijeka Crnojevica

Populated places in Montenegro
Crnojević noble family
Cetinje Municipality
Former capitals of Montenegro